Michael Joyce (4 September 1851 – 9 January 1941) was an Irish politician who twice served as Mayor of Limerick and was the Member of Parliament for the Limerick City constituency of the United Kingdom Parliament from 1900 until 1918.

Early life 
Joyce was born at Merchant's Quay in Limerick in 1851. His father was a river pilot on the Shannon Estuary approach to the port of Limerick. He was educated by the Christian Brothers, attending three of their schools, including CBS Sexton Street. At the age of fourteen, Joyce left Limerick to serve as a seaman. During his time at sea, he survived four separate shipwrecks. Following his return to Limerick in the early 1870s, he became a pilot for Limerick Harbour Commissioners.

Political career 
A supporter of Home Rule for Ireland, Joyce, along with a local priest Robert Ambrose, established the local Limerick branch, the Sarsfield branch, of the Irish National League in 1882.

In 1899, Joyce was elected to Limerick Corporation and stood for election to Parliament at the 1900 general election as a candidate for the Irish Parliamentary Party, defeating the Unionist candidate Francis Kearney by 2521 votes to 474. Joyce served as an MP until 1918. Although intending to run in the 1918 general election, he eventually decided not to seek re-election and was succeeded by the Sinn Féin candidate Michael Colivet, who was elected unopposed.

Joyce was elected Mayor of Limerick in January 1905, serving two successive terms until January 1907.

Joyce became president of the U.K. Pilots' Association in 1910. He was also a founder member of the rugby club Garryowen in 1884, and played in the first fifteen for both that club and Limerick County. He was a member of St Michael's Temperance Society where he played Gaelic football. In 1900 he became the first Captain of St Michael's Rowing Club.

References

External links 

1851 births
1941 deaths
Garryowen Football Club players
Irish Parliamentary Party MPs
Mayors of Limerick (city)
Members of the Parliament of the United Kingdom for County Limerick constituencies (1801–1922)
UK MPs 1900–1906
UK MPs 1906–1910
UK MPs 1910
UK MPs 1910–1918
Rugby union players from County Limerick